The Europe/Africa Zone was one of the three zones of the regional Davis Cup competition in 1992.

In the Europe/Africa Zone there were three different tiers, called groups, in which teams competed against each other to advance to the upper tier. Winners in Group I advanced to the World Group Qualifying Round, along with losing teams from the World Group first round. Teams who lost in the first round competed in the relegation play-offs, with winning teams remaining in Group I, whereas teams who lost their play-offs were relegated to the Europe/Africa Zone Group II in 1993.

Participating nations

Draw

  and  relegated to Group II in 1993.

First round

Kenya vs. Romania

Hungary vs. Poland

Norway vs. Finland

Second round

Portugal vs. CIS

Denmark vs. Kenya

Israel vs. Hungary

Finland vs. Austria

Relegation play-offs

Norway vs. Poland

References

External links
Davis Cup official website

Davis Cup Europe/Africa Zone
Europe Africa Zone Group I